is a video game series created by Kenichiro Takaki, produced by Marvelous and mostly developed by Tamsoft. The franchise revolves around groups of female shinobi, and has received manga and anime adaptations. The anime has been licensed by Funimation Entertainment in North America.

By August 2017, worldwide sales for the games in the series had surpassed over 1.65 million copies.

Video games

Senran Kagura: Shōjo-tachi no Shin'ei and Senran Kagura Burst 

The first game in the series, is a side scrolling action game with playable ninja characters that was released in Japan for the Nintendo 3DS on September 22, 2011. The sequel, consists of the original game and an extra storyline. It was released in Japan for Nintendo 3DS on August 30, 2012 and was later released digitally on the Nintendo eShop on January 10, 2013.

Senran Kagura: New Wave 
Senran Kagura: New Wave is a card battling game available on Android and iOS devices in Japan. The game's popularity resulted in a crossover promotion with DrawGirls, a Korean picture discovery mobile game in which the player draws a cursor across the screen to reveal pieces of a picture.

Senran Kagura Shinovi Versus 

 is the sequel to Senran Kagura Burst. It changes to a on the back view 3D game and features an expanded playable character roster, as well as an online multiplayer mode. The game was released in Japan for the PlayStation Vita on February 28, 2013, in North America on October 14, 2014, and in Europe on October 15, 2014.

Senran Kagura: Bon Appétit! 

Senran Kagura: Bon Appétit! is a rhythm cooking game available for the PlayStation Vita, in which the goal is to win a cooking competition. The game was released on the PlayStation Store on November 11, 2014 for North America, and on November 12, 2014 for Europe.

Senran Kagura 2: Deep Crimson 
Senran Kagura 2: Deep Crimson is a 2.5D side-scrolling action game made for the 3DS, and was developed by the same team which created Senran Kagura Burst. Senran Kagura 2: Deep Crimson was released in Japan on August 7, 2014, for Nintendo 3DS. The game was released in North America, Europe, and Australia via digital and limited physical copies in August through September 2015.

Gameplay 

New gameplay is included in the form of pair battles, which allows a second character, to which the player can give commands, to fight alongside the player's character.

The playable characters in the game are customizable. Outfits, accessory size and position, and hair color can be changed to the player's liking. Augmented reality functionality was also included in the game. The playable characters could be posed against a real-life background in a variety of poses.

Development 
The sequel improved on the original, by enhancing breast physics and clothing destruction, introducing the first playable male character, and allowing for pair battles. Daidouji and Rin, two characters that had originally appeared in Senran Kagura: Shinovi Versus as downloadable content, were part of the regular playable character roster in the game.

Senran Kagura 2: Deep Crimson was part of a cross-promotion deal with Umaibo ("delicious stick" in Japanese), a Japanese brand of corn puff snacks, in which the game's playable characters appeared on the brand's product packaging.

The limited edition, named the “Nyuu Nyuu DX Pack”, included the following extras: a special collectors box; five figurines of the Homura Crimson Squad, characters in the game; a Drama CD; a soundtrack CD; and limited edition original packaging.

European version 
The European version of the game was launched on August 27, 2015. Limited editions include the 'Happy Boobs' edition with two audio CDs, poster and certificate, and the 'Shinobi Edition' which comes with an oppai mouse pad with 3D breasts, and decorative wall scroll.

Senran Kagura: Estival Versus 

Senran Kagura: Estival Versus was released on March 26, 2015 in Japan. The game was released in North America on March 15, 2016 and Europe on March 18, 2016.

Estival Versus has two special editions, one for the PlayStation 4, and one for the PlayStation Vita. The editions are called the Nyuu Nyuu DX Pack Premium, and contained: a copy of the game; a special collectors box; a product code for Senran Kagura: Estival Versus—Eve Full of Swimsuits, a 30-minute original video animation (OVA) featuring 20 of the game's characters; a Drama CD; a soundtrack CD; and mini figurines. The only difference between the two editions are which set of figurines they contain, and what tracks are on each Drama CD. The Vita special edition contains figurines of characters from the Hebijo Clandestine Girls’ Academy, while the PlayStation 4 edition contains figurines from the Gessen Girls’ Private School.
The first-print run of the collectors editions also contained a bonus 2-CD set of the game's soundtrack, and a visual book.

The game sold 44,548 physical retail copies on the PlayStation Vita in addition to 30,247 physical copies on the PlayStation 4 within the first week of release in Japan.

The game features DLC guest characters, the first of whom was the Dead or Alive/Ninja Gaiden series' Ayane. Included in this wave of DLC was Ayane's kimono along with the trademark blue kunoichi costume of Kasumi in a mash-up collab with Marvelous. In return, Dead or Alive 5 Last Round featured a costume set where the females are dressed as Senran Kagura characters and were even breakable on PlayStation 4/Xbox One versions of the game. Ayane in this set is dressed as Yagyū. Besides Ayane, three characters from Ikki Tousen, Hakufu Sonsaku, Uncho Kan'u and Housen Ryofu also appeared as the last three guest characters. Due to temporary licensing issues, the Ikki Tousen characters would temporarily not appear in Western versions until the PC port, which was released on March 17, 2017. Ayane character was delisted from online store in March 17, 2021.

Senran Kagura: Peach Beach Splash 

Senran Kagura: Peach Beach Splash is a water gun third-person shooter for the PlayStation 4 and Microsoft Windows. It features over 30 girls who play on teams. Peach Beach Splash was released in Japan on March 16, 2017. The game released in North America on September 26, 2017 and in Europe on September 22, 2017 for the PlayStation 4, and later worldwide on March 7, 2018 for the PC.

As part of full collaboration with Tecmo Koei's Team Ninja on releasing the DLC costumes in Dead or Alive 5: Last Round and Dead or Alive Xtreme 3, and adds Ayane as a DLC character in Estival Versus, the Dead or Alive characters' Marie Rose and Honoka are announced, along with Ayane who appeared as a DLC character in Estival Versus to be DLC characters in this game. As part of collaboration with Nitroplus since the console version of Nitroplus Blasterz: Heroines Infinite Duel, Super Sonico is added as one of the DLC characters. Three Ikki Tousen characters who appeared as DLC in Estival Versus return as DLC again, in addition of the fourth Ikki Tousen DLC character Shimei Ryoumou. It later introduces three new DLC guest characters, the titular protagonist of Idea Factory’s Hyperdimension Neptunia, and Rinka and Ranka Kagurazaka from Valkyrie Drive.

Senran Kagura: Reflexions 
A spin-off title for the Nintendo Switch, an ecchi dating sim game called  was released in Japan on November 23, 2017. The game takes advantage of the Joy-Con's "HD Rumble" feature, allowing players to receive feedback from jiggle physics. It was published by Xseed Games on the European and North American eShop under the title Senran Kagura: Reflexions on September 13, 2018.

Shinobi Master Senran Kagura: New Link 
Shinobi Master Senran Kagura: New Link is a mobile game for iOS and Android smartphones devices in Japan. New Link also guest-starring characters from other series, such as Dead or Alive (in addition of Kasumi and Tamaki), Ikki Tousen (in addition of Cho’un Shinryu), SNK series (Mai Shiranui, Athena Asamiya, Leona Heidern and Kula Diamond), Queen's Blade (Leina, Airi, Elina, Tomoe and Shizuka), High School DxD (Rias Gremory, Akeno Himejima, Koneko Toujou, Rossweisse and Raynare) and Hyakka Ryōran: Samurai Girls (Jūbei Yagyū and Kanetsugu Naoe). It was created by GigaMedia.

Senran Kagura Burst Re:Newal 
Senran Kagura Burst Re:Newal is a remake of the first game in the series in the same gameplay style as Shinovi Versus and Estival Versus.

Senran Kagura: Peach Ball 
A second spin-off game for the Nintendo Switch, an ecchi pinball game called  was announced in 2017. The game was released in Japan on December 13, 2018, and scheduled for release in North  America, Europe, and Australia on July 9, 2019. It features a mode similar to Senran Kagura Reflexions that takes advantage of the Joy-Con's "HD Rumble" feature.

Neptunia x Senran Kagura: Ninja Wars 
Originally titled Senran Nin Nin Ninja Taisen Neptune: Shoujo-tachi no Kyouen,, Neptunia x Senran Kagura: Ninja Wars is a crossover game with the Hyperdimension Neptunia series, released on September 16, 2021 in Japan and October 26, 2021 in North America for the PlayStation 4.

Controversy 
In 2014, Official Nintendo Magazine wrote a preview about Senran Kagura 2: Deep Crimson (misnaming it as Senran Kagura Burst 2), labeling the game as "filth" and describing it as sexual objectification with breasts and buttocks. This elicited a response from Hatsuu, the Production Coordinator at Xseed Games, to unofficially reply, criticizing the writer's views as superficial and ignorant to the game's characters, story and actual gameplay. She also mentioned that a writer for Official Nintendo Magazine unsuccessfully attempted to boycott the game without having any knowledge, and that the writer made inappropriate jokes such as describing large breasts as "smuggling fleshy watermelons".

Other media

Manga 
There are various manga series based on the franchise. The main adaptation, written by Kenichirō Takaki and illustrated by Amami Takatsume, began serialization in Media Factory's Monthly Comic Alive magazine from August 27, 2011. Seven Seas Entertainment began releasing the series in North America in November 2013 as Senran Kagura: Skirting Shadows. Senran Kagura: Guren no Uroboros, illustrated by Manabu Aoi, began serialization in Ichijinsha's Comic Rex magazine from September 27, 2011. Senran Kagura Spark! was published in Enterbrain's Famitsu Comic Clear between August 19, 2011 and February 17, 2012, followed by Senran Kagura: Senshi Bankō no Haruka and Senran Enji Kyonyū-gumi, both published between September 7, 2012 and February 1, 2013.

Anime 

An anime television adaptation animated by Artland aired in Japan between January 6, 2013 and March 24, 2013. The series is directed by Takashi Watanabe with scripts by Takao Yoshioka and character designs by Takashi Torii. The anime is licensed in North America by Funimation Entertainment, who streamed it as it aired and released it on home video in 2014.

A second season of the anime series was announced in August 2017. The season, titled Senran Kagura Shinovi Master -Tokyo Yōma-hen-, is directed by Tetsuya Yanagisawa and animated by TNK, with scripts written by Yukinori Kitajima and character designs handled by Junji Goto. The season premiered from October 12 to December 28, 2018 on AT-X, Tokyo MX, and BS11. The opening theme, "Scarlet Master" is performed by Sayaka Sasaki, while the ending theme, "Junsei Erotic" is performed by Mia Regina.  Crunchyroll streams the series with Funimation streaming the simuldub.

References

External links 

 
 

 
2011 manga
2011 video games
2012 manga
2012 video games
2013 Japanese television series endings
2013 video games
2014 video games
Action anime and manga
Action video games
Android (operating system) games
Anime television series based on video games
Artland (company)
Crunchyroll anime
Enterbrain manga
Funimation
Hack and slash games
Hoods Entertainment
Ichijinsha manga
IOS games
Kadokawa Dwango franchises
Manga based on video games
Marvelous Entertainment franchises
Media Factory manga
Ninja in anime and manga
Video games about ninja
Nintendo 3DS games
Nintendo 3DS eShop games
Nintendo Network games
PlayStation 4 games
PlayStation Vita games
Seinen manga
Seven Seas Entertainment titles
Side-scrolling video games
TNK (company)
Video game franchises
Video games featuring female protagonists
Windows games